Cedar Park Christian School is a private Christian school with four campuses: Bothell, Mill Creek, Bellevue, and Lynnwood.  As of 2020, CPCS has 1,591 students and a student/teacher ratio of  19.1. and a racial break down breakdown: White:62.8%, Not Specified:14.4%, Asian:13.9%, African American:3.5%, Two or more races:2.5%, Hispanic:2.3%, American Indian:0.4%

History
Cedar Park Christian School was founded By Pastor Joe Fuiten in 1982 with eight preschool students and the first graduating class in 1997. Until 1994 school year, Cedar Park Christian School consisted of a single campus of approximately 300 students. In 2004, the new high school building was completed.

Graduation Count
2012 110 
2013 110 
2015 87 
2016 81 
2017 80

Football High School Head Coach
2001 - 2008 Greg Salios 
2008 - 2011 Craig Shetterly 
2011 - 2014 Todd Parmenter 
2014 - 2017 Bill Marsh 
2017 - 2019 Butch Goncharoff 
2019 - 2022 Manase Hopoi

Football Awards
1A State Tournament: 2003, 2004, 2005, 2006, 2007, 2008

Accreditation
Cedar Park Christian Schools is approved by the State of Washington and is accredited by AdvancED, The National Council for Private School Accreditation (NCPSA), and The Association of Christian Teachers and Schools (ACTS).

References

External links
 Official Site of Cedar Park Christian Schools

Assemblies of God schools
Christian schools in Washington (state)
1982 establishments in Washington (state)
High schools in King County, Washington
Private elementary schools in Washington (state)
Private high schools in Washington (state)
Private middle schools in Washington (state)
Schools in Bothell, Washington